Sir John Norman Toothill CBE (11 November 1908 – 5 July 1986) was an English electrical engineer who rose to be Managing Director of Ferranti.

He was the author of the ground-breaking Toothill Report of 1961 and was one of the creators of the modern Scottish electronics industry.

Life
He was born on 11 November 1908 at 13 Trafford Road in Leicester, the only son of John Harold Toothill, an engineer's fitter, and his wife, Helena Gibbins.

Educated at Beaminster Grammar School in Dorset, Toothill left school at the age of seventeen to be apprenticed to Tilling Stevens Ltd, a company in Maidstone which made buses. From there he moved on to Hoffman Manufacturing and then to Harris Lebus, a furniture manufacturer. In 1935 he was appointed as chief cost accountant to Ferranti, which was then a company making electrical instruments, and in 1942 became manager of its new works in Edinburgh. He remained as general manager of Ferranti Scotland until 1968, promoting the company's development into precision engineering and playing a large part in the creation of a Scottish electronics industry. He remained a director of Ferranti until 1975 and in the 1970s and 1980s was also a director of R. W. Toothill Limited, W. A. Baxter & Sons Limited, Fochabers, Moray. He was chairman of AI Welders of Inverness and of Highland Hydrocarbons from 1979 until his death.

In 1947 Toothill was chosen as chairman of the Research Committee of the Scottish Council for Development and Industry, and later chaired its Finance Committee. In 1956 he became a director of Ferranti. He was appointed to an Inquiry into the Scottish Economy, and in 1961 his Toothill Report on the Scottish Economy was published, recommending new investment in the country's less prosperous areas. In the 1964 New Year Honours he was knighted.

Honours
Commander of the Order of the British Empire, 1955
Companion, Institution of Electrical Engineers
Honorary Companion, Royal Aeronautical Society
Knighthood, 1964
Honorary LLD, University of Aberdeen, 1966
Honorary DSc, Heriot-Watt University, 1968
Honorary DSc, Cranfield Institute of Technology, 1970

Notes

1908 births
1986 deaths
Commanders of the Order of the British Empire
English knights
People educated at Beaminster Grammar School
20th-century English businesspeople